The Highways and Byways series of 36 regional guides were published between 1898 and 1948 by Macmillan's. These guides were noted for their presentation of a wide variety of interesting places, notable historical events, local flora and fauna, folklore, and legends, as well as the artwork, produced by many noted artists, including: Arthur B. Connor, Nelly Erichsen, Frederick L. Griggs, Joseph McCullough, Edmund H. New, Joseph Pennell, Hugh Thomson, Sir D.Y. Cameron and S. R. Badmin.  At the end of each book were folded maps.

David Milner edited a selection from the guides which was published as The Highways and Byways of Britain in 2008.

Listing by date of first edition
1898 Highways and Byways in North Wales by A. G. Bradley  illustrated by Joseph Pennell and Hugh Thomson
1899 Highways and Byways in Donegal and Antrim by Stephen Gwynn with illustrations by Hugh Thomson 
1899 Highways and Byways in Yorkshire by Arthur H. Norway with illustrations by Joseph Pennell and Hugh Thomson
1900 Highways and Byways in Normandy by Percy Dearmer with illustrations by Joseph Pennell and Hugh Thomson
1901 Highways and Byways in East Anglia by William A. Dutt with illustrations by Joseph Pennell 
1901 Highways and Byways in the Lake District by A. G. Bradley with illustrations by Joseph Pennell
1902 Highways and Byways in Hertfordshire by Herbert W. Tompkins with illustrations by F.L. Griggs
1902 Highways and Byways in London by Mrs. E. T. Cook with illustrations by F.L. Griggs
1903 Highways and Byways in South Wales by A. G. Bradley with illustrations by F.L. Griggs
1904 Highways and Byways in Sussex by E. V. Lucas with illustrations by F.L. Griggs
1905 Highways and Byways in Oxford and the Cotswolds by Herbert A. Evans with illustrations by F.L. Griggs
1906 Highways and Byways in Berkshire by J. E. Vincent with illustrations by F.L. Griggs
1906 Highways and Byways in Dorset by Sir Frederick Treves with illustrations by Joseph Pennell
1907 Highways and Byways in Kent by Walter Jerrold  illustrated by Hugh Thomson
1908 Highways and Byways in Hampshire by D. H. Moutray Read with illustrations by Arthur B. Connor
1908 Highways and Byways in Surrey by Eric Parker illustrated by Hugh Thomson
1909 Highways and Byways in Middlesex by Walter Jerrold
1910 Highways and Byways in Buckinghamshire by Clement King Shorter
1910 Highways and Byways in Cambridge and Ely by Rev. Edward Conybeare with illustrations by F.L. Griggs
1910 Highways and Byways in Nottinghamshire by J. B. Firth with illustrations by F.L. Griggs
1911 Highways and Byways in Devon and Cornwall by Arthur H. Norway with illustrations by Joseph Pennell 
1912 Highways and Byways in Somerset by Edward Hutton with illustrations by Nelly Erichsen
1913 Highways and Byways in Hardy's Wessex by Hermann Lea with illustrations by the author
1913 Highways and Byways in The Border by Andrew Lang and John Lang with illustrations by Hugh Thomson
1914 Highways and Byways in Lincolnshire by Willingham Franklin Rawnsley with illustrations by F.L. Griggs
1914 Highways and Byways in Shakespeare's Country by W. H. Hutton with illustrations by Edmund H. New
1916 Highways and Byways in Galloway and Carrick by Rev. C. H. Dick with illustrations by Hugh Thomson
1917 Highways and Byways in Wiltshire by Edward Hutton with illustrations by Nelly Erichsen
1918 Highways and Byways in Northamptonshire and Rutland by Herbert A. Evans with illustrations by F.L. Griggs
1920 Highways and Byways in Northumbria by P. Anderson Graham with illustrations by Hugh Thomson
1926 Highways and Byways in Leicestershire by J. B. Firth with illustrations by F.L. Griggs
1932 Highways and Byways in Gloucestershire by Edward Hutton with illustrations by Hugh Thomson
1935 Highways and Byways in the West Highlands by Seton Gordon with illustrations by Sir D.Y. Cameron
1939 Highways and Byways in Essex by Clifford Bax with illustrations by F.L. Griggs and S. R. Badmin
1939 Highways and Byways in the Welsh Marches by S. P. B. Mais with illustrations by Joseph M. McCullough
1948 Highways and Byways in the Central Highlands by Seton Gordon with illustrations by Sir D.Y. Cameron

References

Travel guide books
Macmillan Publishers books